Movico is a census-designated place and unincorporated community in Mobile County, Alabama, United States. Its population was 291 as of the 2020 census. The town was heavily damaged by an EF2 tornado on January 12, 2023.

Geography
Movico is in northeastern Mobile County, along U.S. Route 43.

Demographics

Education
Residents are zoned to Mobile County Public School System campuses. Residents are zoned to Citronelle High School. The community was formerly in the attendance boundary of the Belsaw/Mr. Vernon K-8 school in Mount Vernon, which closed in 2016.

References

Census-designated places in Mobile County, Alabama
Census-designated places in Alabama